Elche Ilicitano Club de Fútbol, known officially as Elche Ilicitano is a Spanish football team based in Elche, in the autonomous community of Valencia. Founded in 1932 as Club Deportivo Ilicitano, a farm team, it is the reserve team of Elche CF, and plays in Tercera Federación – Group 6, holding home games at the Estadio José Díez Iborra, with a capacity of 1,500 seats.

Unlike in nations such as England, reserve teams in Spain play in the same football pyramid as their senior team rather than a separate league.

History
The city of Elche started the 1930s with just over thirty-five thousand inhabitants, who shared interest in football. In April 1932 a new sports initiative arose, when a group of young people founded Club Deportivo Ilicitano (Sportman Club Ilicitano).

Background
Sportman Club Ilicitano - (1932–41)
Club Deportivo Ilicitano - (1941–92)
Elche Club de Fútbol, S.A.D. "B" - (1992–2005)
Elche Ilicitano - (2005–present)

Season to season
As CD Ilicitano, an independent team

As reserve team of Elche CF

2 seasons in Segunda División
2 seasons in Segunda División B
38 seasons in Tercera División
2 seasons in Tercera Federación

Current squad
.

From Youth Academy

Coaching staff

   Dani Llácer

   Alejandro Martínez

   Fran

References

External links
Elche official website 
Futbolme team profile 
Club news 

Football clubs in the Valencian Community
Association football clubs established in 1932
Spanish reserve football teams
Elche CF
1932 establishments in Spain
Segunda División clubs